Taenarum or Tainaron (Ταίναρον) or Taenarus or Tainaros (Ταίναρος) was a town of ancient Laconia, situated at the distance of 40 stadia, or , north of the isthmus of the Taenarian Peninsula (modern day Cape Matapan). A cavern near Tenarus was considered the entrance to the Greek underworld, through which Heracles dragged Cerberus in his 12th labor, and also through which Orpheus led Eurydice back among the living. Through this association the infernal world was often styled "Tenarus" among classicist writers.

Taenarum was famous for a green marble much prized in the ancient world, as well as the purple snail that yielded the prized Lacedaemonian Purple dye. It was also famous for valuable marble, known for its red and black elements.

Taenarum, was also the seat of a bishop; no longer a resident see, it remains a titular see, suffragan of Corinth, in the Roman Catholic Church.

Its site is located near the modern Tainaron.

References

Populated places in ancient Laconia
Former populated places in Greece
Locations in Greek mythology
Catholic titular sees in Europe